Ximenes Redoubt is a redoubt in Salina Bay, Naxxar, Malta. It was built by the Order of Saint John in 1715-1716 as one of a series of coastal fortifications around the Maltese Islands, and it was originally called Salina Right Redoubt. Two warehouses were grafted on the redoubt in the second half of the 18th century so as to store salt from nearby salt pans. It was eventually renamed after Grand Master Francisco Ximénez de Tejada, whose coat of arms can be seen on one of the warehouses. The redoubt and warehouses have been recently restored.

History

Salina Right Redoubt was built between 1715 and 1716 as part of the Order of Saint John's first building program of coastal fortifications. It was one of two redoubts defending Salina Bay. The redoubt on the other side of the bay, known as Perellos Redoubt, was demolished after World War II.

The redoubt was unique in Malta, as it was the only one which consisted of just a polygonal enclosure with a high parapet wall designed to protect infantrymen. It did not have a blockhouse, which was a feature found in most other redoubts in the Maltese islands. Since it was a small work, it only cost 316 scudi, 9 tari, 10 grani and 2 piccoli to build, which was less than one third the cost of an average redoubt.

After 1741, two fougasses were built, one within the redoubt and another just outside its wall. One of the fougasses still survives today, and it is among the best preserved ones to be found in Malta.

In about 1750, a large building was grafted onto the redoubt. It served as both a magazine and a warehouse, to serve as storage space for salt from the nearby salt pans at Salina. A second warehouse was built in the 1770s, during the reign of Grand Master Francisco Ximénez de Tejada. The new warehouse had a large escutcheon with Ximenes' coat of arms above the doorway, and the redoubt became known as the Ximenes Redoubt.

The redoubt did not have any armament, equipment or munitions in 1785.

Present day
Today, the redoubt lies on the Baħar iċ-Ċagħaq–Salina coast road, and it is overshadowed by the Coastline Hotel. The redoubt as well as the nearby salt pans were restored between 2011 and 2013.

In 2013, the redoubt was vandalized when graffiti were sprayed on one of its walls. This has since been removed.

References

External links

National Inventory of the Cultural Property of the Maltese Islands
YouTube video about Ximenes Redoubt

Redoubts in Malta
Naxxar
Hospitaller fortifications in Malta
Military installations established in 1715
Warehouses in Malta
Salt production
Limestone buildings in Malta
National Inventory of the Cultural Property of the Maltese Islands
18th-century fortifications
1715 establishments in Malta
18th Century military history of Malta